Ebba Birgitta von Otter (born 7 January 1939) is a Swedish journalist, author and debater.

Early life
Von Otter was born during her parents' stay in Budapest, Hungary. She is the elder daughter of Göran von Otter, a Swedish diplomat in Berlin during World War II. She is also the older sister of Casten von Otter, Mikael von Otter (1945–2018) and Anne Sofie von Otter.

Career 
Von Otter became a licensed physiotherapist in Stockholm in 1962. She was a journalist with Åhlén & Åkerlund from 1971 to 1976 and Aktuellt i Politiken from 1977 to 1979. She served as press secretary at SAP's press service from 1979 to 1982 and information secretary for her husband Kjell-Olof Feldt at the Ministry of Finance from 1982 to 1988 and political expert from 1989 to 1990. She moved to work as a writer and freelance writer in 1990.

von Otter also had a leading role in the documentary "A Swedish Tiger" (first shown in 2018 in the United States and Germany) which is based on a meeting in 1942 between her father Göran von Otter and SS officer Kurt Gerstein, and problematizes missing or delayed reporting on the Holocaust during World War II.

Personal life 
From 1962 to 1970, von Otter was married to Gunnar Hörstadius and had three children, including Erik Hörstadius. In 1970, she married her second husband, politician Kjell-Olof Feldt (born 1931).

Bibliography
1989 – Personligt meddelande (novel)
1991 – Navelsträngar och narrspeglar
1991 – Alla dessa dagar (with Kjell-Olof Feldt)
1994 – Glömskans flod (novel)
1996 – Kom igen! – tillbaka till arbetslivet
1996 – Följa med till slutet – om att vaka vid en dödsbädd, Birgitta von Otter, Maud Pihlblad
2000 – Snöängel (novel)
2003 – I cancerns skugga – ett år av förtvivlan och hopp, Kjell-Olof Feldt & Birgitta von Otter
2010 – Kvarlevor (novel)
2013 – Barnläkarfallet: En förnekad rättsskandal (with Kjell-Olof Feldt)
2016 – Vägen ut. En loggbok om alkoholism och medberoende'' (with Kjell-Olof Feldt)

References

External links

1939 births
Living people
Writers from Budapest
Writers from Stockholm
Swedish nobility
Swedish women journalists
20th-century Swedish journalists
21st-century Swedish journalists
20th-century Swedish women writers
21st-century Swedish women writers